The 2001–02 Turkish Ice Hockey Super League season was the 10th season of the Turkish Ice Hockey Super League, the top level of ice hockey in Turkey. Nine teams participated in the league.

Regular season

Playoffs

Semifinals 
 Polis Akademisi ve Koleji - Bogazici PSK Istanbul 6:0
 Büyükşehir Belediyesi Ankara Spor Kulübü - Izmir Büyüksehir BSK 6:5

3rd place
 Izmir Büyüksehir BSK - Bogazici PSK Istanbul 3:2

Final 
 Polis Akademisi ve Koleji - Büyükşehir Belediyesi Ankara Spor Kulübü 1:5

External links
 Season on hockeyarchives.info

TBHSL
Turkish Ice Hockey Super League seasons
TBSHL